John T. Pritchard (December 20, 1883 – June 2, 1965) was a member of the Wisconsin State Assembly.

Biography
Pritchard was born on December 20, 1883, in Caernarfon, Wales. He moved to the United States in 1905 and settled in Eau Claire, Wisconsin. Pritchard later attended the University of Wisconsin-Madison, where he studied agriculture. A lifelong dairy farmer, he had seven children with his wife, Mary (Pulvermacher) Pritchard. He died on June 2, 1965.

Career
Pritchard was a member of the Assembly from 1933 to 1953 and 1957 to 1962. Additionally, he was a member of the Eau Claire County, Wisconsin Board. He ran for Assembly as a member of the Republican, Democratic and Progressive parties.

References

External links

People from Caernarfon
Welsh emigrants to the United States
Politicians from Eau Claire, Wisconsin
County supervisors in Wisconsin
Members of the Wisconsin State Assembly
Wisconsin Progressives (1924)
Wisconsin Republicans
Wisconsin Democrats
Farmers from Wisconsin
University of Wisconsin–Madison College of Agricultural and Life Sciences alumni
1883 births
1965 deaths
20th-century American politicians